Yasunaga (written: 安永) is a Japanese surname. Notable people with the surname include:

, Japanese Go player
, Japanese manga artist
, Japanese footballer
, Japanese footballer
, Japanese violinist

Japanese-language surnames